Rafael Fernández Pérez (born 13 June 1980), commonly known as Rafa, is a Spanish futsal player who plays for ElPozo Murcia as a goalkeeper.

References

External links
LNFS profile
UEFA profile
ElPozo Murcia profile

1980 births
Living people
Futsal goalkeepers
Sportspeople from Valencia
Spanish men's futsal players
ElPozo Murcia FS players
Playas de Castellón FS players
Inter FS players
Valencia FS players